Nadigella is a genus of spur-throated grasshoppers in the family Acrididae. There is one described species in Nadigella, N. formosanta, found in Europe.

References

External links

 

Acrididae